Khuliso Johnson Mudau (born 26 April 1995) is a South African soccer player who plays as a right-back for South African Premier Division side Mamelodi Sundowns.

Early life
He was born in Messina – now known as Musina – in Limpopo.

Club career
After playing for JDR Stars, Magesi and Black Leopards, he signed for Mamelodi Sundowns on a five-year contract in October 2020.

Style of play
He plays as a right-back. He can also play as a midfielder.

References

Living people
1995 births
South African soccer players
Association football defenders
JDR Stars F.C. players
Magesi F.C. players
Black Leopards F.C. players
Mamelodi Sundowns F.C. players
South African Premier Division players
National First Division players